Hilario Zapata (born August 19, 1958) is a Panamanian former professional boxer who competed from 1977 to 1993. He is a world champion in two weight classes, having held the WBC light flyweight title twice between 1980 and 1983 and the WBA flyweight title from 1985 to 1987.

Professional career
Zapata began his professional boxing career in 1977, beating Victor Lopez by a knockout in the second round. He had 2 wins in '77.

He had a fast ascent to the top, starting in 1978. By his fifth bout, on July 1, he was meeting former world Flyweight champion Juan Guzmán in Panama City, beating Guzman by a decision in ten. His next fight, against Yong-Hwang Kim, in South Korea, was his first fight abroad; he gave himself a twentieth birthday present by beating Kim by a 10-round decision on August 19. Then, he met former world Flyweight champion Alfonso Lopez, for the vacant Latin American Jr. Flyweight belt. Zapata suffered his first loss in the fight against Lopez, when he was beaten by a decision in 12.

He started 1979 with a fight against Ramon Perez in Puerto Rico, winning by a knockout in nine. He had three more wins in 1979, including one over the two time world Flyweight champion Freddie Castillo, and by the end of that year he was ranked number one in the world among Jr. Flyweight challengers by the WBC.

Zapata went to Japan in March 1980, and on the 24th day of that month he beat defending world champion Shigeo Nakajima to become world Jr. Flyweight champion. He defended his title against Chi-Bok Kim, winning a 15-round unanimous decision in South Korea, against Hector Rey Melendez in Venezuela, winning also by a 15-round decision, against Nakajima in a Tokyo rematch, winning by knockout in 11, and against Reynaldo Becerra in Venezuela. He closed out 1980 win a 15-round decision win over Becerra.

In 1981, he and future world Flyweight champion Joey Olivo fought what was the only Jr. Flyweight title bout ever broadcast on American national TV live until Michael Carbajal came along nine years later. Zapata beat Olivo by a knockout in round 13 to retain his belt, and then, he went to San Francisco to retain the crown once again, with a 15-round decision over Rudy Crawford. On August 15, and back home in Panama City, he beat Mexican German Torres by a decision in 15 to retain his belt, and then he faced former world Jr. Flyweight champion Netrnoi Sor Vorasingh, retaining the belt by a knockout in 10.

In his next fight, on February 6, 1982, Zapata lost the world title by knockout in two at the hands of Amado Panterita Ursua, but Ursua in turn would lose it to Tadashi Tomori. On July 20, Zapata regained the world title by beating Tomori on a 15-round decision in Japan. Then, he beat future world champion and Zapata-conqueror Jung-Koo Chang by a decision in 15 in Chonju, and he closed out the year with a rematch against Tomori in Tokyo, knocking Tomori out in eight rounds.

On March 26, 1983, Zapata and Chang met again in South Korea, and this time, Chang became world champion by knocking Zapata out in the third round. Then, on November 9 at Las Vegas, on the Marvin Hagler vs. Roberto Durán's undercard's week, Zapata was beaten by a knockout in 10 by Harold Petty.

His career seemingly over, he quickly recovered from those back to back losses and began winning again, but this time as a Flyweight. By the end of 1984, he was ranked number one by the WBA among Flyweights, and on December 8 of that year, he challenged world Flyweight champion Santos Laciar of Argentina at Buenos Aires' legendary Luna Park. Zapata lost a 15-round decision that night, but in 1986, after Laciar had vacated the crown, the WBA gave him a second chance, and he beat Alonzo Gonzalez to win the WBA world Flyweight championship. He then beat Javier Lucas to retain the belt. He retained the title also against Shuichi Hozumi, Dodie Penalosa, Alberto Castro and Claudemir Calvalho, all by decision, before losing it to Fidel Bassa of Colombia, also by a decision.

In 1993, he tried to become a world champion once again, but was knocked out in the first round by the WBC world Jr. Bantamweight champion Sung-Kil Moon. A win against Moon would have made Zapata a member of the exclusive group of world boxing champions in three different weight categories or more.

It can also be added that Zapata's first pair of boxing gloves, when he was 12, came as a present from Duran himself.

Panamanian newspaper El Panama America declared on one of their editorials that Zapata, according to their opinion, should be inducted to the International Boxing Hall Of Fame soon. Zapata eventually was voted into the Hall of Fame, in December 2015, and was inducted during June 2016.

Zapata had a record of 43 wins and 10 losses, with 1 draw, and 14 wins by knockout.

Professional boxing record

See also 
List of WBC world champions

References

External links 
 

1958 births
Living people
World Boxing Council champions
World light-flyweight boxing champions
World boxing champions
Panamanian male boxers
International Boxing Hall of Fame inductees